Dato' Teng Chang Khim (born 2 June 1963) is a Malaysian politician who has served as Member of the Selangor State Executive Council (EXCO) in the Pakatan Rakyat (PR) and Pakatan Harapan (PH) state administrations under Menteris Besar Khalid Ibrahim, Azmin Ali and Amirudin Shari since May 2013 as well as Member of the Selangor State Legislative Assembly (MLA) for Bandar Baru Klang since May 2018, for Sungai Pinang from March 2004 to May 2018, for Bandar Klang from November 1999 to March 2004 and for Bukit Gasing from April 1995 to November 1999. He also served as 9th Speaker of Selangor State Legislative Assembly from April 2008 to May 2013. He is a member of the Democratic Action Party (DAP), a component party of the PH snd formerly PR, Barisan Alternatif (BA) as well as Gagasan Rakyat (GR) coalitions.

Teng had obtained his bachelor’s degree in law from the University of London and had started his legal career as an advocate and solicitor at the High Court of Malaya from 1995 until 2008.

On 2 December 2020, he announced his retirement plan from active politics and will not seek re-election both in the next coming general election and in the party.

Personal life 
He is an elder brother to Teng Chang Yeow, the former Member of the Penang State Legislative Assembly for Padang Kota. Unlike Teng Chang Khim himself, Teng Chang Yeow is a member of the Parti Gerakan Rakyat Malaysia (GERAKAN), a former component of the Barisan Nasional (BN) coalition. Nevertheless, both are sons of Teng Boon Ngap, who was a prominent member of the Malaysian Chinese Association (MCA) of BN before 1980s. They are also nephews to the former Tebrau MP Teng Boon Soon.

Controversies and issues
In 2012, DAP chairman Karpal Singh had rebuked Teng on the acceptance "Datukship" in 2010 and Ngeh Koo Ham of Perak award in 2008 which breached the party's long-standing principal agreed upon since the mid-1990s on DAP elected representatives not receiving awards during their active political service.

Election results

Honours

Honours of Malaysia
  :
  Knight Commander of the Order of the Crown of Selangor (DPMS) – Dato' (2010)

References

External links
 

Living people
1963 births
People from Selangor
Malaysian people of Chinese descent
20th-century Malaysian lawyers
Democratic Action Party (Malaysia) politicians
Members of the Selangor State Legislative Assembly
Selangor state executive councillors
Speakers of the Selangor State Legislative Assembly
Alumni of the University of London
21st-century Malaysian politicians
Knights Commander of the Order of the Crown of Selangor
21st-century Malaysian lawyers